Charles "Schärlu" Casali (27 April 1923 – 8 January 2014) was a Swiss football midfielder who played for Switzerland in the 1954 FIFA World Cup. He also played for BSC Young Boys.

References

External links
FIFA profile
 bscyb.ch: YB trauert um Charles Casali. 9 January 2014

1923 births
2014 deaths
Swiss men's footballers
Swiss people of Italian descent
Switzerland international footballers
Association football midfielders
BSC Young Boys players
1954 FIFA World Cup players
Footballers from Bern
Swiss Super League players